Vail Pass is a  mountain pass in the Rocky Mountains of central Colorado.  The pass was named for Charles Vail, a highway engineer and director of the Colorado State Highway Department from 1930 to 1945.

Vail Pass lies on the boundary between Eagle and Summit counties, between Vail on the west and Copper Mountain on the east. It provides the route of Interstate 70 (and earlier U.S. Highway 6) between the upper basins of the  Eagle River and the Blue River, both tributaries of the Colorado River.  Black Gore Creek, a tributary of Gore Creek, in the watershed of the Eagle, descends from the north side of the pass towards the town of Vail.  West Tenmile Creek, in the watershed of the Blue, descends from the south side. The pass is significantly steep on either side (7% max.), and two runaway truck ramps are available on the west bound side for trucks.

The pass has been featured on dangerousroads.org as one of the most difficult sections of road to navigate in Colorado: "Vail Pass, a difficult road in Colorado", due to its extreme grade, high elevation and frequent weather related hazardous driving conditions.

The pass was not a traditional historical route of the Rockies. Prior to 1940, the most common route westward was over nearby Shrine Pass, just to the south, which leads to the town of Red Cliff in the upper Eagle Valley. In 1940, the construction of U.S. Highway 6 bypassed Shrine Pass in favor of the current route to the valley of Gore Creek.

Recreation 

A bike path parallels I-70 from Vail Colorado to the Copper Mountain Ski Area and is the only pass in Colorado with a paved bike path on both sides for the entire distance. This 8.7 mile climb from East Vail with an 1,831 foot (558m) vertical gain and descent to Copper is a popular activity for cyclists during the summer and fall.  This route leads to several other bike paths in Summit County. During the winter months the area hosts backcountry skiing and snowmobile activities.

See also
Colorado mountain passes

References

External links

 Colorado Highway Conditions and Closures
 Vail Pass Recreation Information

Mountain passes of Colorado
Landforms of Eagle County, Colorado
Landforms of Summit County, Colorado
Transportation in Eagle County, Colorado
Transportation in Summit County, Colorado
Interstate 70